The Carnegie Library, historically known as the Upland Public Library, is a Carnegie library located at 123 East D Street in Upland, California. Built in 1913, the library was the first public building in Upland. Architect Homer W. Glidden designed the library in the Classical Revival style. The library's design features a projecting central entrance with a plain frieze supported by two columns and brick pilasters, a stucco parapet extending around most of the building, and a cornice set above dentils. The building served as a library until 1969, when the library moved to a new building. The City of Upland still owns the building and rents it to the public for community events. It is also used by the Upland Public Library to house its Literacy Program.

The library was added to the National Register of Historic Places on December 10, 1990.

References

External links

Upland
Buildings and structures in San Bernardino County, California
Upland, California
Library buildings completed in 1913
Libraries on the National Register of Historic Places in California
National Register of Historic Places in San Bernardino County, California
Neoclassical architecture in California
1913 establishments in California